1270 Datura, provisional designation  is a stony asteroid and namesake of the young Datura family, located in the inner regions of the asteroid belt, approximately  in diameter. It was discovered on 17 December 1930, by Belgian–American George Van Biesbroeck at the Yerkes Observatory in Williams Bay, Wisconsin, United States. The S-type asteroid has a rotation period of 3.4 hours. It was named after the flowering plant Datura.

Orbit and classification 

Datura is the principal body of the tiny Datura family located within the Flora family region, which is one of the largest clans of asteroid families. The Datura family is thought to have recently formed from the collisional destruction of a larger parent body some 450–600 thousand years ago.

The asteroid orbits the Sun in the inner asteroid belt at a distance of 1.8–2.7 AU once every 3 years and 4 months (1,220 days; semi-major axis of 2.23 AU). Its orbit has an eccentricity of 0.21 and an inclination of 6° with respect to the ecliptic. The body's observation arc begins with its official discovery observation at Williams Bay in December 1930.

Naming 

This minor planet was named after the Datura, a genus of poisonous flowering plants. The official naming citation was mentioned in The Names of the Minor Planets by Paul Herget in 1955.

Physical characteristics 

Datura spectrum is similar to that of an old S-type asteroid, thought to consist of silicate rocks covered with regolith with composition known from ordinary chondrite. This is in agreement with the overall spectral type of both the Datura and the encompassing Flora family.

Rotation period 

In February 2008, a rotational lightcurve of Datura was obtained from photometric observations by Naruhisa Takato using the Subaru telescope on Hawaii. Lightcurve analysis gave a sidereal rotation period of  hours with a brightness amplitude of 0.46 magnitude. The result is similar to observations by Wisniewski (3.2 h), Vokrouhlický (3.3583 h), and Székely (3.4 h).

In 2013, lightcurve modelling by an international study using photometric data from the US Naval Observatory, the Uppsala Asteroid Photometric Catalogue and the Palmer Divide Observatory, gave a concurring rotation period of 3.358100 hours as well as a spin axis of (0°, 59.0°) in ecliptic coordinates (λ, β). An improved spin-axis determination by Vokrouhlický gave two poles at (60.0°, 76.0°) and (264.0°, 77.0°), respectively.

Diameter and albedo 

According to the surveys carried out by the Japanese Akari satellite and the NEOWISE mission of NASA's Wide-field Infrared Survey Explorer, Datura measures 7.83 and 8.20 kilometers in diameter and its surface has an albedo of 0.291 and 0.288, respectively. The Collaborative Asteroid Lightcurve Link assumes an albedo of 0.24 – taken from 8 Flora, the principal body of the Flora family – and derives a diameter of 8.15 kilometers based on an absolute magnitude of 12.61.

References

External links 
 Asteroid Lightcurve Database (LCDB), query form (info )
 Dictionary of Minor Planet Names, Google books
 Discovery Circumstances: Numbered Minor Planets (1)-(5000) – Minor Planet Center
 
 

001270
Discoveries by George Van Biesbroeck
Named minor planets
19301217